The year 1865 in science and technology involved some significant events, listed below.

Archaeology
 John Lubbock publishes Pre-historic Times, as Illustrated by Ancient Remains, and the Manners and Customs of Modern Savages, including his coinage of the term Palæolithic.

Astronomy
 Vassar College Observatory opens at Poughkeepsie, New York, with Maria Mitchell as its first director.

Chemistry 
 Friedrich Kekulé proposes a ring structure for benzene.
 Adolf von Baeyer begins work on indigo dye, a milestone in modern industrial organic chemistry which revolutionizes the dye industry.
 Johann Josef Loschmidt indirectly determines the number of molecules in a mole, later named the Avogadro constant.

Life sciences
 Louis Pasteur shows that the air is full of bacteria.
 Joseph Lister begins to experiment with antiseptic surgery in Glasgow using carbolic acid.
 Max Schultze gives the first known description of the platelet.
 Claude Bernard publishes Principes de Médecine experimentale.
 February 8 & March 8 – Gregor Mendel reads his paper, Versuche über Pflanzenhybriden (Experiments on Plant Hybridization), at two meetings of the Natural History Society of Brünn in Moravia.
 May 17 – Father Armand David first observes Père David's Deer in China.
 June–August – Francis Galton formulates eugenics.
 September – John Henry Walsh (writing as 'Stonehenge' in the magazine The Field) gives the first definition of a dog breed standard (for the pointer) based on physical form.
 September 28 – Elizabeth Garrett Anderson obtains a licence from the Society of Apothecaries in London to practice medicine, the first woman to qualify as a doctor in the United Kingdom, and sets up in her own practice.

Physics
 Rudolf Clausius gives the first mathematical version of the concept of entropy, and also names it.
 James Clerk Maxwell publishes A Dynamical Theory of the Electromagnetic Field.

Technology
 Aveling and Porter produce the world's first steam roller at Rochester in England.
 Hermann Sprengel produces the Sprengel pump which is capable of creating a significant vacuum.

Awards
 Copley Medal: Michel Chasles
 Wollaston Medal in Geology: Thomas Davidson

Births
 January 22 – Friedrich Paschen (died 1947), German physicist.
 February 1 – Henry Luke Bolley (died 1956), American plant pathologist.
 March 19 – William Morton Wheeler (died 1937), American entomologist.
 March 31 – Anandi Gopal Joshi (died 1887), Indian physician.
 April 28 – Charles W. Woodworth (died 1940), American entomologist.
 June 27 – John Monash (died 1931), Australian civil engineer and General.
 August 10 – Charles Close (died 1952), Jersey-born cartographer.
 October 12 – Arthur Harden (died 1940), English biochemist, Nobel Prize in Chemistry recipient.
 November 4 – Chevalier Jackson (died 1958), American laryngologist and pioneer of endoscopy.

Deaths
 January 14 –  Marie-Anne Libert (born 1782), Belgian botanist. 
 January 31 – Hugh Falconer (born 1808), British geologist, botanist, paleontologist and paleoanthropologist.
 April 23 – Diego de Argumosa (born 1792), Spanish surgeon.
 April 30 – Robert FitzRoy (born 1805), English admiral and meteorologist, suicide.
 May 27 – Charles Waterton (born 1782), English naturalist and explorer.
 July 25 – Dr. James Barry (born 1789-1799), Irish-born military surgeon.
 August 12 – Sir William Jackson Hooker (born 1785), English botanist.
 August 13 – Ignaz Semmelweis (born 1818), Hungarian physician, following restraint in insane asylum.
 August 26 – Johann Franz Encke (born 1791), German astronomer.
 August 29 – Robert Remak (born 1815), Polish/Prussian Jewish embryologist.
 September 2 – Sir William Rowan Hamilton (born 1805), Irish mathematician, physicist and astronomer.
 October 17 – Joseph-François Malgaigne (born 1806), French surgeon.

References

 
Science, 1865 In
1860s in science
19th century in science